William Owen Gooding Williams (23 November 1929 – 19 March 2013) was a Welsh international rugby union player. A prop forward, he played club rugby for Gowerton, Swansea and the Royal Navy. At international level he represented Wales on 22 occasions and was chosen to represent the British Isles team on their 1955 tour of South Africa. 
 
On the 1955 British Isles tour, the all-Welsh front row of Billy Williams, Bryn Meredith and Courtney Meredith was selected for a Lions test match. This did not occur again until June 2009 when Gethin Jenkins, Adam Jones and Matthew Rees were selected as the British & Irish Lions front row for the 2nd Test against South Africa.

References

1929 births
2013 deaths
Barbarian F.C. players
British & Irish Lions rugby union players from Wales
British boilermakers
Devonport Services R.F.C. players
Gowerton RFC players
Rugby union players from Swansea
Swansea RFC players
Wales international rugby union players
Welsh rugby union players
Rugby union props